Sydney Alfred Dineen (7 November 1914 – 10 November 1989) was an Australian rules footballer who played with South Melbourne in the Victorian Football League (VFL).

Dineen came from Preston originally and played three seasons for South Melbourne. He was on a half forward flank in the 1936 VFL Grand Final, which South Melbourne lost to Collingwood.

His younger brother, Ken, also played for South Melbourne.

References

1914 births
Australian rules footballers from Victoria (Australia)
Sydney Swans players
Preston Football Club (VFA) players
1989 deaths
People from Greensborough, Victoria